Thavathiru Santhalinga Adigalar Arts, Science and Tamil College, is a general degree college located at Perur, Coimbatore District, Tamil Nadu. It was established in the year 1953. The college is affiliated with Bharathiar University. This college offers different courses in arts, commerce and science.

Departments

Science
Mathematics
Computer Science

Arts and Commerce
Tamil
English
History
Economics
Commerce

Accreditation
The college is  recognized by the University Grants Commission (UGC).

Notable alumni
 Puviarasu, Tamil poet

References

External links

Educational institutions established in 1953
1953 establishments in Madras State
Colleges affiliated to Bharathiar University
Academic institutions formerly affiliated with the University of Madras